The  Washington Redskins season was the franchise's 54th season in the National Football League (NFL) and their 49th in Washington, D.C.  The team failed to improve on their 11–5 record from 1984 and finished 10-6. The biggest moment of the year occurred on a November 18 Monday Night Football game, which witnessed Joe Theismann's career-ending injury after a sack by New York Giants outside linebacker Lawrence Taylor.  The tackle resulted in a serious leg injury, and Theismann never played in the NFL again.  Though the team failed to make the playoffs, they remained in contention for the entire regular season.

Offseason

NFL Draft

Personnel

Staff

Roster

Regular season

Schedule
{| class="wikitable" style="text-align:center"
|-
!style=""| Week
!style=""| Date
!style=""| Opponent
!style=""| Result
!style=""| Record
!style=""| Venue
!style=""| Attendance
!style=""| Gamerecap
|- style="background:#fcc"
! 1
| 
| at Dallas Cowboys
| L 14–44
| 0–1
| Texas Stadium
| 62,292
| Recap
|- style="background:#cfc"
! 2
| September 15
| Houston Oilers
| W 16–13
| 1–1
| RFK Stadium
| 53,553
| Recap
|- style="background:#fcc"
! 3
| September 22
| Philadelphia Eagles| L 6–19
| 1–2
| RFK Stadium
| 53,748
| Recap
|- style="background:#fcc"
! 4
| September 29
| at Chicago Bears
| L 10–45
| 1–3
| Soldier Field
| 63,708
| Recap
|- style="background:#cfc"
! 5
| 
| St. Louis Cardinals| W 27–10
| 2–3
| RFK Stadium
| 53,134
| Recap
|- style="background:#cfc"
! 6
| October 13
| Detroit Lions
| W 24–3
| 3–3
| RFK Stadium
| 52,845
| Recap
|- style="background:#fcc"
! 7
| October 20
| at New York Giants| L 3–17
| 3–4
| Giants Stadium
| 74,389
| Recap
|- style="background:#cfc"
! 8
| October 27
| at Cleveland Browns
| W 14–7
| 4–4
| Cleveland Municipal Stadium
| 78,540
| Recap
|- style="background:#cfc""
! 9
| November 3
| at Atlanta Falcons
| W 44–10
| 5–4
| Atlanta–Fulton County Stadium
| 42,209
| Recap
|- style="background:#fcc"
! 10
| November 10
| Dallas Cowboys| L 7–13
| 5–5
| RFK Stadium
| 55,750
| Recap
|- style="background:#cfc"
! 11
| 
| New York Giants| W 23–21
| 6–5
| RFK Stadium
| 53,371
| Recap
|- style="background:#cfc"
! 12
| November 24
| at Pittsburgh Steelers
| W 30–23
| 7–5
| Three Rivers Stadium
| 59,293
| Recap
|- style="background:#fcc"
! 13
| December 1
| San Francisco 49ers
| L 8–35
| 7–6
| RFK Stadium
| 51,321
| Recap
|- style="background:#cfc"
! 14
| December 8
| at Philadelphia Eagles| W 17–12
| 8–6
| Veterans Stadium
| 60,737
| Recap
|- style="background:#cfc"
! 15
| December 15
| Cincinnati Bengals
| W 27–24
| 9–6
| RFK Stadium
| 50,544
| Recap
|- style="background:#cfc"
! 16
| 
| at St. Louis Cardinals| W 27–16
| 10–6
| Busch Memorial Stadium
| 28,090
| Recap
|}Note: Intra-division opponents are in bold text.

Game summaries

Week 1: at Dallas CowboysSource: Pro-Football-Reference.com
    
    
    
    
    
    
    
    
    
    

Week 2: vs. Houston OilersSource:''' Pro-Football-Reference.com

Week 7

Week 11

Standings

See also
Operation Flagship

References

Washington
Washington Redskins seasons
Wash